Denis Horník (born 13 July 1997) is a Slovak footballer who plays for Petržalka as a defender.

Career

Spartak Trnava
As youth player of its academy, Horník signed a three-and-half-year professional contract with Spartak Trnava in February 2016. 
He made his professional debut for Trnava against Zemplín Michalovce on 27 February 2016.

References

External links
 FC Spartak Trnava official club profile
 
 Futbalnet Profile

1997 births
Living people
Slovak footballers
Association football defenders
FC Spartak Trnava players
FC ViOn Zlaté Moravce players
FC Petržalka players
Slovak Super Liga players
People from Galanta
Sportspeople from the Trnava Region